Multi-National Division (South-East) (MND(SE)) was a British commanded military division responsible for security in the south east of Iraq from 2003 to 2009. It was responsible for the large city of Basra (or Basrah) and its headquarters were located at Basra Airport. The division was initially responsible for the governorates (roughly provinces) of Al Muthanna, Maysan, Basra, and Dhi Qar. MND-SE was a subordinate division of Multi-National Corps Iraq. Multi-National Corps Iraq was itself part of Multi-National Force-Iraq.

History
In aftermath of the 2003 invasion of Iraq, which had the British codename 'Operation Telic,' the British 1st Armoured Division and 3rd Mechanised Division were successively responsible for the command and control of the occupation forces in south east Iraq. After 3rd Mechanised Division's tour of duty came to an end it was replaced by a composite headquarters still known as MND (SE).

General Officers Commanding
 December 2003 – July 2004: Major-General Andrew Stewart , British Army
 July–November 2004: Major-General Bill Rollo, British Army
 December 2004 – June 2005: Major-General Jonathon Riley, British Army
 June–December 2005: Major-General James Dutton, Royal Marines
 December 2005 – July 2006: Major-General John Cooper, British Army
 July 2006 – January 2007: Major-General Richard Shirreff, British Army
 January–August 2007: Major-General Jonathan Shaw, British Army
 August 2007 – February 2008: Major-General Graham Binns, British Army
 February–August 2008: Major-General Barney White-Spunner, British Army
 August 2008 – March 2009: Major-General Andy Salmon, Royal Marines

Major General Andy Salmon (COMUKAMPHIBFOR) handed over command of the area to the U.S. 10th Mountain Division on 31 March 2009 and the division headquarters closed on that day.  After a transfer of authority on 20 May 2009, the 34th Infantry Division, an Army National Guard Division from Minnesota commanded by Major General Richard C. Nash assumed control of the sector which would eventually redesignate to become U.S. Division-South in August 2009.

Order of battle
In the months following the end of the invasion, the division expanded to include UK, Dutch, Norwegian, Italian, Japanese, Australian, NZ, Romanian, Danish, Portuguese, Czech and Lithuanian troops. As of February 2007, the Australians, Romanians, Danes, Czechs and Lithuanians remain (see Multinational Force in Iraq for further information). The UK itself had about 5,500 personnel serving in Iraq, separated into the following battlegroups, as of 1 June 2007:

Land component
Headquarters, 1st Mechanised Brigade
Messines & Cambrai Company from London Regiment (Force protection)
215th Signal Squadron, Royal Signals
Two squadrons from the Household Cavalry Regiment
Cassino Company, 4th Battalion The Parachute Regiment. ROBG (1 SCOTS+1RIR)
The King's Royal Hussars
Two squadrons from the 2nd Royal Tank Regiment
1st Battalion, Irish Guards
One company from 1st Battalion, The Royal Welsh
2nd Battalion, The Royal Welsh
1st Regiment, Royal Horse Artillery
22nd Engineer Regiment
One squadron from 23rd Pioneer Regiment, Royal Logistic Corps
3rd Logistic Support Regiment, Royal Logistic Corps
One company from 6th Battalion, Royal Electrical and Mechanical Engineers
3rd Close Support Medical Regiment, Royal Army Medical Corps
158th Provost Company, 3rd Regiment, Royal Military Police
22nd Battery, 32nd Regiment, Royal Artillery
34th Field Hospital, Royal Army Medical Corps

Air component
845 Naval Air Squadron (Sea King Mk 4)
Detachment from 652 Squadron, Army Air Corps (Lynx)
No. 1419 Flight RAF (Merlin)
No. 1 and 2 Squadrons RAF Regiment
4th Force Protection Wing
No. 120 Squadron RAF/No. 201 Squadron RAF (Nimrod MR2)
No. 51 Squadron RAF (Nimrod R1)
814 Naval Air Squadron (Merlin)
No. 216 Squadron RAF (TriStar)
No. 32 (The Royal) Squadron RAF (BAe 125/BAe 146)
No. 617 Squadron RAF (Tornado GR4)
No. 23 Squadron RAF/No. 30 Squadron RAF (C-130J Hercules)
No. 101 Squadron RAF (VC10)

Maritime component
HMS Cornwall
HMS Enterprise
RFA Bayleaf
Two Mine Countermeasures vessels
Contribution to the 60-man joint US-UK 'Naval Transition Team'

See also
 Multinational Brigade South-East (Romania)
 List of United Kingdom Military installations used during Operation Telic
 Battle of Basra (2003)
 Multi-National Force troop deployment in Iraq 2003–2011

References

Military units and formations established in 2003
Multinational force involved in the Iraq War